Caudellia floridensis is a species of snout moth in the genus Caudellia. It was described by Herbert H. Neunzig in 1990, and is known from the US state of Florida.

References

Moths described in 1990
Phycitinae